Catherine Samali Kavuma (born 1960) is a novelist  and a prominent Ugandan personality.

Biography
Catherine Kavuma was born in Nkokonjeru, Uganda and at the age of eight she moved with her family to the UK, where her father was employed by the Uganda Coffee Marketing Board. In the early 1970s, her family moved to Ethiopia.

Early life and education 
Catherine attended Loreto Convent School, Msongari, in Nairobi, Kenya, where she finished secondary education. She then returned to the UK to study, at St. Francis de Sales Convent in Tring, Hertfordshire.

In 1980 Ms. Kavuma moved to the United States to study at the State University of New York (SUNY) College at Cortland, where she earned a bachelor's degree in Anthropology, specializing in Archeology. During her studies at SUNY, she founded the "Culture Club", an anthropological society aimed at raising funds to invite prominent scholars and specialists in the field of Anthropology and Archeology to the college. Dr. Richard Leakey was such a guest in 1983.

Career 
In the mid-1980s Ms. Kavuma moved to Washington, D.C. to work with the Ambassador of Uganda to the United States, Elizabeth Bagaya. She later became employed with the Embassy of Canada. Two years on she was offered employment with the World Bank as a Program Assistant in the office of the Executive Director for Africa in 1989.  She retired from the World Bank in 2014.

Personal life
Catherine Samali Kavuma has two children, Nadia and Philip, a grandson named Joaquin and two granddaughters named Skyla and Nova She lives in the DMV.

Publications
Malita and other stories. New Jersey: Sungai Books, 2002 (183 pp.).  HB / 1-889218-29-4 PB.

References

External links
  Interview with Catherine Samali Kavuma by Asmaou Diallo, published in Amina, March 2003.

1960 births
Living people
Ugandan women writers
Ugandan novelists
Ugandan women novelists